Sahira Kazmi (born 13 June 1946) is a retired Pakistani actress, producer and  director. She is best known for her role in the country's first-ever colour series Parchaiyan (1976) and for producing the cult-classic blockbuster series Dhoop Kinare (1987) and the acclaimed drama Nijaat (1993).

Early life 
Kazmi was born on 13 June 1946 in Bombay to Shyam and Mumtaz Qureshi (also known as Taaji), both actors and prominent figures in the film industry of British India. However, after her father Shyam's tragic death in 1951, her family moved to Karachi, which was part of the new state of Pakistan. Sahira's mother, Mumtaz remarried a Pakistani entrepreneur with the surname Ansari. Sahira and her brother Shaakir changed their surnames and became Sahira Ansari and Shakir Ansari. Sahira and her brother also joined the acting field and both became prominent names in Pakistan's acting industry.

Career 
Sahira's career began in the 1970s when she started acting in PTV dramas at the PTV World in Rawalpindi. Her first play was Qurbatein aur Faslay (1974), based on Ivan Turgenev's novel Fathers and Sons, followed by Parchaiyan (1976), based on Henry James’ novel The Portrait of a Lady, which was followed by another series Teesra Kinara (1980). Sahira became famous for her roles in Parchaiyan and Teesra Kinara alongside the actor Rahat Kazmi, who she later married in the late 1970s.

Later, Sahira realized her passion lay in directing content and soon she turned towards directing and producing dramas. She had already directed a number of programmes after her first play. but she made her debut as a director when she launched the series Hawa ke Naam.  The highlighted women's rights and their imaging in Pakistan. Sahira joined Pakistan television Karachi center as a permanent employee and worked as director. She directed many dramas that went on to become a classic in the film industry. Some of her best known dramas such as Tappish, Dhoop Kinaray, Aahat, Hawa Ki Beti, Nijaat and Zaibunnissa, Dhoop Kinaray (1987), written by Haseena Moin, and starred Rahat Kazmi and Marina Khan. The drama became Sahira's most notable work in her production career. The series succeeded even after two decades of its production. In 2019, the series were also translated into Arabic, to play the drama in Saudi Arabia. The step was taken as part of a cultural exchange between Saudi Arabia and Pakistan. Federal information minister Fawad Chaudhry announced during a visit to the Saudi capital of Riyadh that Islamabad would soon export its television series to the Kingdom. Arab News said the move is part of a push by Saudi Crown Prince Mohammed bin Salman in the last three years to modernize the Kingdom where cinemas, public concerts and other forms of entertainment have been banned for decades.

Sahira is known for producing dramas and plays that highlighted social and political issues. Her drama Tappish revolved around a student leader and also highlighted the issue of rape. Aahat, Nijaat, Hawa Ki Beti and Zaib-Un-Nisa highlighted with issues like poverty, domestic abuse and hardships of women. in 1993, Sahira took a break from her career and came back with a new project Tum Se Kehna Thaa; a play inspired by the Hollywood film While you were sleeping. Sahira is also made the hit telefilms Rozi, which starred actor Moeen Akhter and Zikr Hai Saal Kaa, starring Rahat Kazmi and Atiqa Odho. She also produced the drama Kaise Kahoon, which starred the actress Marina Khan.

Sahira has also produced many music programs for PTV. She was behind the song "Dekha Na Tha Kabhi Hum Nay Yeh Saman" , which was sung by the singer Alamgir. Sahira also came up with a song "Tere Ishq Mein Jo Bhi Doob Gaya", sung by the folk singer Allan Fakir and pop star Mohammad Ali Shehki. The song combined the words of Urdu and Sindhi.

Personal life 
In the later 1970s, Sahira married Rahat Kazmi; a prominent actor with whom Sahira had worked in many dramas. It was then that Sahira changed her name to Sahira Kazmi. The two lived in Karachi and had a daughter Nida Kazmi and son Ali Kazmi.

Awards and recognition 
 In 1984, she was awarded PTV Award for Best Actress.
 In 2012, Sahira was awarded the Pride of Performance Award by the government of Pakistan for her outstanding efforts in the field of television industry.
 
During the ceremony, Sahira said:

Dramas 
 Qurbatein aur Faslay (1974)
 Parchaiyan (1976)
 Teesra Kinara (1980)
 Khaleej (1986)
 Dhoop Kinare (1987)
 Hawa Ki Beti (1990)
 Aahat (1991)
 Nijaat (1993)
 Rozi (1993—Telefilm)
 Zikar Hai Kai Saal Ka (1995)
 Tum Se Kehna Tha (1995)
 Kaise Kahoon (1999)
 Tapish (2000)
 Zaib-un-Nisa (2000)

References

External links 
 

20th-century Pakistani actresses
Living people
1946 births
Pakistani television actresses
Pakistani directors
Pakistani producers
People from Sialkot
Punjabi people
Recipients of the Pride of Performance
PTV Award winners